Past Our Means is a six track EP by Californian hardcore punk, Ignite. It was released on September 13, 1996 on Revelation Records. It follows the previous year's full-length album Call On My Brothers.

Overview
Ignite, at the time of this EP, played melodic hardcore, heavily influenced by bands like Government Issue and No For An Answer – not least because of Zoli Teglas' vocal style and patterns. Short, fast-paced songs punctuated only by the stomping mid-tempo of "In Defense". Lyrically, most songs tackle subjects such as loyalty, society, and general strife. However, on the final track, "Taken Away", Teglas draws on his experiences in his Hungarian homeland.

Track listing
All songs written by Ignite
"Holding On"	–	2:02
"Past Our Means"	–	2:23
"In Defense"	–	3:00
"Embrace"	–	2:22
"Self-Made Man"	–	1:20
"Taken Away"	–	2:55

Credits
 Zoli Teglas – vocals
 Joe D. Foster – guitar
 Brett Rasmussen – bass
 Casey Jones – drums
 Jim Goodwin – octave guitar on "Past Our Means"
 Recorded April 22 – 26, 1996 at Paramount Studios, California, USA
 Produced by Jim Goodwin and Ignite
 Recorded and mixed by Jim Goodwin

External links
Ignite official website
Revelation Records EP page
Abacus Recordings band page

1996 EPs
Revelation Records EPs
Ignite (band) albums